"" ("At the back of the holy temple") is a duet from Georges Bizet's 1863 opera Les pêcheurs de perles. The libretto was written by Eugène Cormon and Michel Carré. Generally known as "The Pearl Fishers' Duet", it is one of the most popular numbers in Western opera – it appeared on seven of the Classic 100 Countdowns conducted by ABC Classic FM. It is sung by Nadir (tenor) and Zurga (baritone) in act 1.

Context
After a self-imposed absence, Nadir returns to the shores of Ceylon, where his friend Zurga has just been elected Fisher King by the local pearl fishermen. The two had once fallen in love with the same woman, but then pledged to each other to renounce that love and remain true to each other. On meeting again, they sing this duet, remembering how they first fell in love/were fascinated with a veiled priestess of Brahma whom they saw passing through the adoring crowd.

A key moment in the opera, this duet is the clearest depiction of the triangular relationships between the protagonists. The obvious situation at this point is that males will value their friendship higher than a heterosexual relationship. Peter Weir uses this duet in his 1981 film Gallipoli without the heterosexual aspect, purely to express male mateship and loyalty between a pair of doomed soldiers. A different view is possible by a reading of the duet as a "pair of parallel monologues", emphasizing the rivalry and deceit between the men.

This duet reappears at the end of the opera, but is sung in unison as the soprano Leila and the tenor Nadir sing together of their love which will transcend all their trials—while Zurga sacrifices himself, knowing of their love, as he lets them flee to safety.

Music

The duet starts in the key of E-flat major and the time signature of common time; after a general pause following the words "Elle fuit!", the score briefly omits all signature accidentals, and the time signature changes at "Non, que rien ne nous sépare" to  before returning to the starting configuration on "Oui, c'est elle" in the final duet. Nadir's part ranges from F3 to B4 with the tessitura between A3 and G4. Zurga's part ranges from D3 to E4. Depending on the version and on cuts to the recitatives within the aria, it takes between 4 1/2 to 6 minutes to perform.

Lyrics

References

External links

"Au fond du temple saint", Aria Database
, sung Jussi Björling and Robert Merrill

Compositions by Georges Bizet
Opera excerpts
1863 compositions
Arias in French
Compositions in E-flat major